The LVI legislative period of the Chilean Congress will sit from 11 March 2022 to 10 March 2026.

It was elected at the 2021 Chilean general election.

Composition

Senate

Deputies

List of Deputies

References 

Legislative periods of Chile
Chile
2022 establishments in Chile